The World Firefighter Games is an international sporting event that welcomes all full-time, part-time and volunteer structural firefighters and bush firefighters, and aviation fire services and military emergency response personnel and their immediate direct family from all across the globe.

The games are held biennially in different countries and offer more than 50 different sports and challenges including archery, rugby sevens, windsurfing, poker, swimming, athletics and softball, with the "Toughest FireFighter Alive" being the blue riband event.

Purpose
The games began in 1988 with the first ever World Firefighters Games held in Auckland, New Zealand from 22 to 29 April 1990. This initial outing drew 1800 athletes and 1400 supporters from 17 countries.

The purpose of the games was to introduce the four following concepts within the services:

  To promote health and fitness
  To provide a forum for information exchange between fire services
  To foster comradeship amongst firefighters
  To encourage family participation

The motivation behind the games was to overcome some of the problems with entering the World Police and Fire Games, in that the games are only open to full-time paid firefighters. As most fire services globally use mostly volunteer personnel the World Firefighters Games allows entrants that are full-time, part-time and volunteer, as well as the families of fire service personnel to enter.

After the first games, an attempt was made to register the name to seek profit. But when the games were held in Perth, Western Australia in 1994 the organising committee felt so strongly about the games belonging to the firefighter that they bought the rights from the original owners and Perth has now become the home of the world governing body, "World Firefighters Games WA Inc". The  governing body licenses each fire department and allows use of the name and branding for the running of the event. The governing body is entirely a non-profit organization and all proceeds are donated to charity.

The largest games to date were held in Chungj, Republic Of South Korea from 10–18 September  2018 with approximately 6,600 athletes and 20,000 supporters and spectators.

LA 2014 was cancelled by the "proprietor" of the games sometime during the week of 19 May 2014.

The 2020 games in Aalborg were postponed to May 2021, due to the COVID-19 pandemic and have since been locked in for the 7th to the 14th September 2024 .

Toughest FireFighter Alive
The Toughest Firefighter Alive, which is specific to the World Firefighters Games, is carried out in full firefighting kit and tests competitors in a number of firefighting-specific disciplines.

There are four parts, all carried out in full firefighting kit.

1. The hose run, carrying a BA set.

2. Obstacle course: competitors are required to carry various pieces of equipment whilst negotiating tunnels and walls.

3. Tower: competitors are required to handle and pitch ladders and to carry firefighting equipment up ropes.

4. Stair climb: competitors are required to climb to the top of a tower, the height of which can vary depending on the country but will normally vary from 100-200m.

At the 2010 games competitors were required to climb Daegu Tower which is 202m high with 83 stories.

Games
 1990. Auckland, New Zealand 22 to 29 April - 1,800 Athletes, 17 Countries, 34 Events. Winners: New Zealand
 1992. Las Vegas, USA 16 to 22 May - 4,000 Athletes, 22 Countries, 45 Events. Winners: USA
 1994. Perth, Australia 20 to 26 March - 2,000 Athletes, 21 Countries, 48 Events. Winners: Australia
 1996. Edmonton, Canada 28 July to 3 August, 2,300 Athletes, 25 Countries, 54 Events. Winners: Canada
 1998. Durban, South Africa 17 to 23 May 1,800 Athletes, 26 Countries, 55 Events. Winners: South Africa
 2000. Mantes-La-Jolie, France 6 to 13 July, 4,000 Athletes, 56 Countries, 61 Events. Winners: France
 2002. Christchurch, New Zealand 26 October to 2 November 1,500 Athletes, 30 Countries, 58 Events. Winners: New Zealand Fire Service
 2004. Sheffield, England 28 August to 4 September, 2,500 Athletes, 40 Countries, 59 Events. Winners: England
 2006. Hong Kong 18 to 25 February, 3,000 Athletes, 37 Countries, 59 Events. Winners: China
 2008. Liverpool, England 25 August to 3 September, 3,000 Athletes, 46 Countries, 74 Events. Winners: England
 2010. Daegu, Korea  from 21–29 August 5230 participants, 46 Countries, 75 Events. Winners Korean Fire Service
 2012. Sydney, Australia 19–28 October 1500 Athletes, 30 Countries, 60 Events. Winners: Australia (the Sydney 2012 World Firefighters Games were conducted by WFG Events Pty Ltd under Licence from World Firefighters Games WA Inc)
 2018. Chungju, South Korea, 10–17 September 2018. The largest number of competitors to attend the games 6,600
 2020. Aalborg, Denmark, Postponed  to 2024
 2022. Lisbon, Portugal, April 30 to May 7, 2022 The games returned post Co-Vid with over 40 countries in attendance.
 2024. Aalborg, Denmark, September 7 to 14 2024

Results

 http://worldfirefightersgames.com/
 https://web.archive.org/web/20191020073402/http://worldfirefightersgames.com/index.php/game-stats/previous-games/1990-games/1990-results
 https://web.archive.org/web/20191020073345/http://worldfirefightersgames.com/index.php/game-stats/previous-games/1992-games/1992-results - Incomplete
 https://web.archive.org/web/20191020073458/http://worldfirefightersgames.com/index.php/game-stats/previous-games/1994-games/1994-results
 https://web.archive.org/web/20191020073317/http://worldfirefightersgames.com/index.php/game-stats/previous-games/1996-games/1996-results
 https://web.archive.org/web/20191020073257/http://worldfirefightersgames.com/index.php/game-stats/previous-games/1998-games/1998-results
 https://web.archive.org/web/20191020073259/http://worldfirefightersgames.com/index.php/game-stats/previous-games/2000-games/2000-results
 https://web.archive.org/web/20191020073300/http://worldfirefightersgames.com/index.php/game-stats/previous-games/2002-games/2002-results
 https://web.archive.org/web/20191020073312/http://worldfirefightersgames.com/index.php/game-stats/previous-games/2004-games/2004-results
 https://web.archive.org/web/20191020073308/http://worldfirefightersgames.com/index.php/game-stats/previous-games/2006-games/2006-results
 https://web.archive.org/web/20191020073136/http://worldfirefightersgames.com/index.php/game-stats/previous-games/2008-games/2008-results
 https://web.archive.org/web/20191020071916/http://worldfirefightersgames.com/index.php/game-stats/previous-games/2010-games/2010-results
 https://web.archive.org/web/20191020071927/http://worldfirefightersgames.com/index.php/game-stats/previous-games/2012-games/2012-results
 https://web.archive.org/web/20191020074223/http://worldfirefightersgames.com/index.php/game-stats/previous-games/2014-games - Cancelled
 https://web.archive.org/web/20191020073607/http://worldfirefightersgames.com/index.php/game-stats/previous-games/2018-games - Have Not Medal Table
 https://web.archive.org/web/20190618182228/http://overseas.mofa.go.kr/au-en/brd/m_3304/view.do?seq=756602&srchFr=&amp%3BsrchTo=&amp%3BsrchWord=&amp%3BsrchTp=&amp%3Bmulti_itm_seq=0&amp%3Bitm_seq_1=0&amp%3Bitm_seq_2=0&amp%3Bcompany_cd=&amp%3Bcompany_nm=&page=5 - The 13th World Firefighters Games Chungju, 2018 
 https://web.archive.org/web/20180814195906/http://wfg2018.chungbuk.go.kr/eng/index.php
 https://web.archive.org/web/20180525223525/http://wfg2018.chungbuk.go.kr/eng/sub.php?code=02_info04
 https://web.archive.org/web/20181108191339/http://wfg2018.chungbuk.go.kr/eng/sub.php?code=02_info030101
 https://web.archive.org/web/20181022152728/http://wfg2018s.chungbuk.go.kr/event/sub.php?menukey=519 - 2018 Nations Medal Table
 https://web.archive.org/web/20181108192005/http://wfg2018s.chungbuk.go.kr/event/sub.php?menukey=519&mod=list2 - 2018 Clubs Medal Table
 https://web.archive.org/web/20181108191942/http://wfg2018s.chungbuk.go.kr/event/sub.php?menukey=519&mod=list3 - 2018 Sports Medal Table

Events
The core sports of the games are archery, arm wrestling, badminton, basketball (3:5, 5:5), bodybuilding, ten-pin bowling, bucket brigade, cross country running, cycling, climbing, darts, eight-ball, nine-ball, golf, horseshoes, judo, karate, bowls, marathon, half marathon, poker, powerlifting, rugby sevens, sailing, skeet shooting, soccer, fastpitch softball, softball, squash, swimming, table tennis, tennis, Toughest Firefighter Alive, track and field, trap shooting, triathlon, tug of war, volleyball (2 man/ 6 man), windsurfing, and wrestling.

Host countries will vary the events depending on their national games, traditions, and culture.

References

External links
  World Firefighters Games Governing Body Web Page

Firefighting competitions
Multi-sport events